Khurshed Alam Khan (5 February 1919 – 20 July 2013) was an Indian politician and a senior leader of the Indian National Congress political party.

He was Governor of Karnataka from 1991 to 1999 and governor of Goa from 1989 to 1991. Before that, he was Union minister of External affairs in Government of India. He was associated with Jamia Millia Islamia.

Early life
Khurshed Alam Khan was born on 5 February 1919 in Pitaura Village Farrukhabad District of Uttar Pradesh. After his early education, he joined the Agra University as a student of the prestigious St. John's College, where, he obtained a bachelor's degree with distinction and a master's degree in History. He was also a student at the University of Pennsylvania, U.S.A., where he successfully completed a course in Management Studies.

Khan had an abiding interest in education. He was a member of the Governing Body of Dr. Zakir Husain Memorial College, New Delhi. He served as Chairman of the Board of Governors of the YMCA Institute of Engineering, Faridabad. His abiding interest had been in the Jamia Millia Islamia University at Delhi.

Political career
It was through the efforts of  Khan that Parliament enacted a Law whereby the Jamia Millia Islamia became an independent University.  Khurshed Alam Khan was the Chancellor of this university. He was also member of Council of Indian Institutes of Technology.

Khurshed Alam Khan had the distinction of being a distinguished Parliamentarian for over 15 years as a member of the Rajya Sabha and the Lok Sabha. He was the member of the Rajya Sabha from 1974–84 and the member of the 8th Lok Sabha from 1984–89, representing Farrukhabad constituency. He was a Member of the Union Council of ministers and has handled various portfolios, namely, External Affairs, Tourism, Civil Aviation, Textiles and Commerce.

As minister for External Affairs, he  toured extensively in the world. He had the distinction of addressing the United Nations as also the Security Council on a number of occasions. The Foreign ministers' Conference of Non-Aligned Countries at Delhi and Luanda was presided over by him. In 1988, he represented India at the Republican Party Convention of the U.S.A.

He resigned his Lok Sabha seat when he was appointed the Governor of Goa on 18 July 1989. He also officiated as the Governor of Maharashtra. He has been the Governor of Karnataka since 6 January 1991. He also officiated as the Governor of Kerala.

The areas of special interest to  Khurshed Alam Khan were education, tourism, transport and urban development. Reading and Horticulture were favorite pastimes to which he devoted considerable time. Khurshed Alam Khan was the son-in-law of Dr. Zakir Hussain, the third President of India, married to his older daughter, Saeeda Khurshid. Salman Khurshid,  former Union Minister  for External Affairs (Indian Foreign Minister), is the son of  Khurshed Alam Khan. He also has three daughters. He also has several grandchildren, and was also present for a large part of his great-grandchildren's lives.

References

External links
Rajbhavan Karnataka

Indian National Congress politicians
Indian Muslims
1919 births
2013 deaths
People from Farrukhabad district
Governors of Karnataka
Governors of Kerala
Governors of Goa
Rajya Sabha members from Uttar Pradesh
India MPs 1984–1989
Jamia Millia Islamia
Administrators of Dadra and Nagar Haveli
Administrators of Daman and Diu
Rajya Sabha members from Delhi
Civil aviation ministers of India